Balázs Veress (born 12 October 1980) is a Hungarian former professional tennis player.

Born in Budapest, Veress was an Australian Open junior quarterfinalist and runner-up in Hungary's national championships. In 1998 and 2002 he featured in ties for the Hungary Davis Cup team, with his only win coming in a singles rubber against South Africa's Rik de Voest. He was also a collegiate tennis player in the United States for UC Berkeley. In 2001 he was named both Pac-10 Freshman of the Year and ITA Regional Rookie of the Year.

See also
List of Hungary Davis Cup team representatives

References

External links
 
 
 

1980 births
Living people
Hungarian male tennis players
California Golden Bears men's tennis players
Tennis players from Budapest